Sofiane Bencharif, sometimes spelt as Soufiane Bencherif, (born 11 August 1986 in Ollioules, France) is a French-Algerian football player who is currently playing as a forward for Widad Amel Tlemcen.

On 28 June 2010 Bencharif signed a two-year contract with Tunisian club Olympique Béja. However, on 28 August 2010 it was announced that Bencharif had signed a two-year contract with another Tunisian club, JS Kairouan.

References

External links
 DZFoot Profile
 

1986 births
Living people
Algerian footballers
French footballers
French sportspeople of Algerian descent
ES Sétif players
MC Alger players
Expatriate footballers in Tunisia
Algerian expatriate sportspeople in Tunisia
Algerian Ligue Professionnelle 1 players
WA Tlemcen players
EGS Gafsa players
People from Ollioules
JS Kairouan players
Association football forwards
Sportspeople from Var (department)
Footballers from Provence-Alpes-Côte d'Azur